Linda Lapointe  (born July 2, 1960) is a Canadian businesswoman and politician from Quebec. She was an Action démocratique du Québec (ADQ) Member of the National Assembly for the electoral district of Groulx from 2007 to 2008. She was elected as the federal Member of Parliament (MP) for Rivière-des-Mille-Îles in the 2015 election, as a member of the Liberal Party of Canada, and sat until the 2019 Canadian federal election when she lost her seat.

Biography

Lapointe has a college diploma in health sciences from the CEGEP Ahuntsic. In 1986, she received a bachelor's degree in business administration from the Université de Montréal. Since her teenage years, she has been working at her father's grocery store Provigo. From 1988 to 1997, she worked as the director of the store. She officially took over the family business in 1997, she became the owned and director of Provigo Lapointe et Fille. She sold the store in 2006.

Community involvement 
In addition to her career as a manager, Lapointe was treasurer and member of the Board of the Association des détaillants en alimentation du Québec (Quebec food retailers association) from 2002 to 2006. In 2013, this association has appointed her as a member of its Hall of Fame. In her community, she has been president for the Regrouprement des gens d'affaires of Boisbriand from 2009 to 2015. Since she was 26, she has been actively involved in her community, notably as organizer of Déjeuner de partage.

Political career

Lapointe was first elected to the National Assembly of Quebec in the 2007 election as a member of Action démocratique du Québec in the riding of Groulx. Lapointe took office on April 12, 2007 and was named the critic for economic development and the Montreal region until 2008. She was also the assistant whip of the official opposition party.

Lapointe was defeated in the 2008 election.

She changed parties and ran for the Quebec Liberal Party in the 2012 Quebec general election and was again defeated.

MP for the 42nd Canadian Parliament 
On October 15, 2015, she was elected on the 2015 federal election as a member of the Liberal Party of Canada for the riding of Rivière-des-Mille-Îles. She defeated NDP incumbent Laurin Liu. Shortly after her election Lapointe posted photos on her Facebook page depicting her dressed in a Halloween costume—an Asian hat and robe—which was criticized for cultural appropriation and stereotyping Chinese culture. Lapointe later apologized and removed the photos from Facebook. She was selected by Prime Minister Trudeau's cabinet to sit on two House of Commons parliamentary committees: Standing Committee of Official Languages and Standing Committee on International Trade.

Canadian House of Commons Standing Committee of Official Languages 
As a member of this committee, she studied the Government of Canada programs designed to promote francophone immigration to francophone minority communities in Canada, to establish a new Roadmap for Canada's Linguistic Duality (2008-2013) in partnership with the Minister of Canadian Heritage, Mélanie Joly. Her responsibilities also included studying Air Canada's bilingual service and studying access to justice in both languages.

Canadian House of Commons Standing Committee on International Trade 
As a member of this committee, she, with the other members, directed studies and reports on various aspects of Canada’s international trade policy, such as the Softwood Lumber Agreement between Canada et United States of America, the Transpacific Partnership, and the EU-Canada Comprehensive Economic and Trade Agreement (CETA).

Private Member's Bill C-236 
She introduced a private member's bill on the credit card acceptance fees on February 25, 2016 to members of the House of Commons. The bill was named An act to amend the Payment card Networks act.

Electoral record

Federal

Provincial

^ Change is from redistributed results. CAQ change is from ADQ.

Footnotes

External links
 
 Official Website

1960 births
Living people
Action démocratique du Québec MNAs
Women members of the House of Commons of Canada
Liberal Party of Canada MPs
Members of the House of Commons of Canada from Quebec
People from Boisbriand
Politicians from Laval, Quebec
Université de Montréal alumni
Women MNAs in Quebec
21st-century Canadian politicians
21st-century Canadian women politicians